Cunningham Corner (formerly Cunningham's Corner) is an unincorporated community in Jackson Township, Crittenden County, Arkansas, United States. It is located at the intersection of Highway 147 and  Highway 128 approximately six miles west-northwest of West Memphis.

References

Unincorporated communities in Crittenden County, Arkansas
Unincorporated communities in Arkansas